"All (I Ever Want)" is a song by German recording artist Alexander Klaws. Written by Rob Bolland and produced by Thorsten Brötzmann, it features vocals from singer Sabrina Weckerlin. A German version of the duet, "Alles", was released to promote the RTL television film Held der Gladiatoren (2005). The English version of the song was later included on his third album, Attention! (2006).

Formats and track listings

Charts

References

External links
  
 

2005 singles
2005 songs
Alexander Klaws songs
Songs written by Rob Bolland
Sony BMG singles